Karel Šimůnek (31 August 1869 in Beroun – 19 July 1942 in Prague) was a Czech watercolorist and illustrator, and a designer of posters and of theatrical sets.  He studied at the Academy of Fine Arts in Prague under Professors Václav Brožík and Maximilian Pirner.

1869 births
1942 deaths
Academy of Fine Arts, Prague alumni
People from Beroun
Czech male painters
20th-century Czech printmakers
Czech scenic designers
20th-century Czech painters
20th-century Czech male artists